The project design flood is a hypothetical "maximum probable" flood of the Mississippi River used by the United States Army Corps of Engineers to  aid in the design and execution of flood protection in the Mississippi Valley.

The current project design flood was developed in 1956 by the Mississippi River Commission with input from the Weather Bureau. It is based on a scenario of three rain events in the lower Mississippi Valley occurring 3 days apart: the January 1937 (increased by 10%), January 1950, and then the February 1938 rain event with its center adjusted  to the north and rainfall pattern rotated to achieve a hypothetical worst-case flood of the tributaries of the Mississippi River. Assumptions were made based on the completion of tributary reservoirs and dams by 1960. When the Commission reviewed the plan after the 1973 Mississippi River floods, the Project Design Flood in use was determined to be "based on sound technology that was still reliable by current standards. The project design flood peak discharges remained unchanged."

Once the project design flood was developed, flow rates at critical points are used to determine how high levees need to be, how deep the dredging needs to be, and the flowrates at which flood control structures need to be used.

1928 project design flood
In response to the Great Mississippi Flood of 1927, the Flood Control Act of 1928 authorized the Mississippi River and Tributaries Project (MR&T), which is implemented by the Mississippi River Commission (MRC). In a separate analysis, the U.S. Weather Bureau determined that a "maximum possible" flood would result in a discharge of  based on the maximum recorded flows of the upper Mississippi, Ohio, Cumberland, and Tennessee Rivers. In a combined analysis, the higher flow rate estimate was used.

Adding the flows of the Yazoo and Red Rivers, the Weather Bureau estimated a flow of  just north of Baton Rouge at Red River Landing, Louisiana.

1941 project design flood
The Ohio River flood of 1937 caused the flood stage at Cairo to reach  despite a flow of only . In response, the United States Congress ordered the MR&T to review of the flood control plan.

Current project design flood
The current project design flood was developed at the request of the Senate Public Works Committee in 1954. The Mississippi River Commission and the Weather Bureau worked together to investigate hypothetical flood conditions. The study of a set of 35 combinations of actual storms resulted in the selection of combination called "Hypo-Flood 58A," a combination of previous storms in 1937, 1938, and 1950.

After the 1973 Mississippi River floods, the MRC reviewed the project design flood and found that it was still reliable based on current standards.

See also
Mississippi River floods
Bonnet Carre Spillway

References

Further reading

Mississippi River
United States Army Corps of Engineers